Matthew Beckenham (born 18 March 1976) is an Australian hurdler. He competed in the men's 400 metres hurdles at the 2000 Summer Olympics.

References

1976 births
Living people
Athletes (track and field) at the 2000 Summer Olympics
Australian male hurdlers
Olympic athletes of Australia
Place of birth missing (living people)